Lemsahl-Mellingstedt is a quarter of Hamburg, Germany, in the borough Wandsbek. The population was over 6900 in 2020.

Geography
Lemsahl-Mellingstedt borders the quarters Duvenstedt, Wohldorf-Ohlstedt, Bergstedt, Poppenbüttel and Sasel. It also borders Norderstedt in Schleswig-Holstein. Lemsahl-Mellingstedt is located at the Alster river.

Politics
These are the results of Lemsahl-Mellingstedt in the Hamburg state election in 2015:
 SPD 44.9% 
 CDU 23.1%
 The Greens 9.2% 
 FDP 12.0% 
 AfD 5.9% 
 The Left 3.2% 
 Others 1.7%

Lemsahl-Mellingstedt belongs to the electoral district of Alstertal-Walddörfer.

Society
 Minors: 18.5%
 Elderly: 20.3%
 Households with children: 26.4%
 Foreigners: 4.2%
 Unemployed: 1.8%

Transportation
Lemsahl-Mellingstedt has no S-Bahn or U-Bahn station, but two bus lines to the S-Bahn station Poppenbüttel

References

Quarters of Hamburg
Wandsbek